Schanzenkopf may refer to:

 Schanzenkopf (Schwedenschanze), a wooded hill of Bavaria, Germany
 Schanzenkopf (Spessart), a wooded hill of Bavaria, Germany